A kumbha is a type of pottery in India.

Kumbha may also refer to:

 Kumbha Mela or Kumbh Mela, a Hindu festival and pilgrimage in India
 Kumbha of Mewar (r. 1433-1468), ruler of Mewar kingdom in India
 Kumbha (month), a month in the Indian solar calendar
 Kumbha, the water-bearer sign in Hindu astrology
 Kumbha, a month in the Darian calendar